A rhinoceros is any of five species of ungulates in the family Rhinocerotidae.

Rhinoceros may also refer to:

Music
 Rhinoceros (band), a 1960s American rock band
 Rhinoceros (Rhinoceros album) (1968)
 Rhinoceros (Porno Graffitti album)
 "Rhinoceros" (song), a song by the Smashing Pumpkins
  "Rhinoceros", a song by Block

Politics
 Rhinoceros Party, a current satirical Canadian political party
 Rhinoceros Party of Canada (1963–93), a former satirical Canadian political party

Theatre
 Rhinoceros (play), a 1959 play by Eugène Ionesco
 Rhinoceros (Orson Welles production), a 1960 staging in London
 Theatre Rhinoceros, a theatre group

Visual arts
 Rhinocéros (Jacquemart), a sculpture
 Dürer's Rhinoceros, a woodcut image

Other
 Rhinoceros (film), a motion picture adaptation of the play
 Rhinoceros (genus)
 Rhinoceros 3D, computer modeling software
 Rhinoceros Sutra, an early Buddhist sutra
 Rhinoceros, a locomotive used in Bausman Mine

See also
 Elytropappus rhinocerotis or rhinoceros bush, a plant species in the daisy family
 Nashorn (German for rhinoceros), a German World War II tank destroyer
 Rhinosaurus, a prehistoric lizard
 Rhino (disambiguation)
 Rhinoceros dolphin, a mythological creature
 Rinôçérôse, a French rock/dance band